Negative free bid is a contract bridge treatment whereby a free bid by responder over an opponent's overcall shows a long suit in a weak hand and is not forcing. This is in contrast with standard treatment, where a free bid can show unlimited values and is unconditionally forcing. The treatment is a relatively recent invention, and has become quite popular, especially in expert circles.

Negative free bids resolve relatively frequent situations where the responder holds a long suit with which he would like to compete for a partscore, but is deprived from bidding it by opponent's overcall.

Example
 
For example, if South holds: , partner opens 1 and East overcalls 1, he couldn't bid 2 in standard methods, as it would show 10+ high-card points, and a negative double would be too off-shape. With NFB treatment in effect though, he can bid 2 which the partner may pass (unless he has extra values and support, or an excellent suit of its own without tolerance for hearts).

However, as a corollary, negative free bids affect the scope of negative double; if the hand is suitable for "standard" forcing free bid (10-11+ points), a negative double has to be made first and the suit bid only in the next round. Thus, the negative double can be made with the following types of hand:
A weakish hand with unbid suits (unbid major)
A stronger hand with unbid suits
A strong (opening bid or more) one-suited hand.
This can sometimes allow the opponents to preempt effectively. 
 
For example, West, holding: , after this auction is in an awkward situation — he doesn't know whether partner has spades or not; whether South was bidding to make or to sacrifice — is it correct to double, bid 4 or pass?

See also
Negative double
Support double
Takeout double

External links
Alan Truscott's column in New York Times
5-part series by Karen Walker that originally appeared in the ACBL Bridge Bulletin, Jan-May 2005
Discussion of merits

Bridge conventions